Howsham railway station was a short-lived railway station between the villages of Howsham and Crambe in North Yorkshire, England. Located on the York to Scarborough Line (where the level-crossing now is). It was opened on 5 July 1845 by the York and North Midland Railway and closed in 1849.

It is shown as "Crambe station" on Moule's 1850s maps of North and East Yorkshire, and as Crambe Beck Station in John Philips's Geology of Yorkshire.

References

 

Disused railway stations in North Yorkshire
Railway stations in Great Britain opened in 1845
Railway stations in Great Britain closed in 1849
Former York and North Midland Railway stations
George Townsend Andrews railway stations